Angus Graham may refer to:

James Graham, 7th Duke of Montrose (1907–1992), British-born Rhodesian politician
Angus Graham (footballer) (born 1987), Australian rules football player
Angus Charles Graham (1919–1991), sinologist
 Angus Graham (strongman) (1810–1896)

See also
 Angus Cunninghame-Graham (1893–1981), Royal Navy officer